Charlotte Albertine Ernestine von Stein (also mentioned as Charlotta Ernestina Bernadina von Stein ), born von Schardt; 25 December 1742, Eisenach – 6 January 1827, Weimar, was a lady-in-waiting at the court in Weimar and a close friend to both Friedrich Schiller and Johann Wolfgang von Goethe, whose work and life were strongly influenced by her.

Childhood

Charlotte's parents were Hofmarschall Johann Wilhelm Christian von Schardt (1711–1791) and Koncordia Elisabeth Irving of Drum (1724–1802). While her father was a wasteful eccentric, her mother who had had Scottish ancestors was said to be very quiet and dutiful.

Her parents moved to Weimar when Charlotte was yet a little child and she was prepared for working as a lady-in-waiting. Her education included literature, art, singing and dancing. They said that Charlotte was unobtrusive, witty, graceful and dutiful like her mother was. There were four things she spent most of her time on:

Society (according to her “profession”)
Taking cures (she had a weak constitution)
Literature/Theater/Art (she was an avid writer and later published several dramas, including "Dido" and "Ryno")
Animals (she had various pets, e.g. cats, dogs and doves)

Profession and family

In 1758 Charlotte became a lady-in-waiting to Anna Amalia, Duchess of Saxe-Weimar-Eisenach, whom she served until the Duchess's death in 1807. On 17 May 1764 Charlotte married Baron Gottlob Ernst Josias Friedrich von Stein (1735–1793). It was not a marriage for love, but for social and political interests. Often Charlotte remained alone in Weimar, as her husband travelled a great deal in the service of the Duke of Saxe-Weimar in Jena. From 1764 to 1773 she gave birth to seven children. Four daughters died; three boys, Karl, Ernst and Fritz, survived. After her seventh child was born, Charlotte was physically exhausted, and took a succession of cures. She was also the aunt of Amalia von Helvig, who became a member of the Royal Swedish Academy of Music.

Works

Charlotte von Stein wrote four plays, only one was published during her lifetime, Die zwey Emilien (The Two Emilies). The play was published anonymously, but with Schiller's name on the cover, which led many to believe that he was the author. Not until 1923 was Die zwey Emilien published under Charlotte von Stein's name. A second play, Die Probe (The Trial or The Rehearsal), may have been written by Charlotte von Stein. It was published in 1809 and has since disappeared. Charlotte von Stein wrote two more texts, both of which were untitled and have also been lost. The first was a story and the second another comedy. 

Rino (1776)

Dido (1794)

Neues Freiheitssystem oder die Verschwörungen gegen die Liebe (New System of Freedom or the Conspiracy Against Love) (1798)

Die zwey Emilien (The Two Emilies) (1800)

Charlotte and Goethe

In 1774 Johann Wolfgang von Goethe and Charlotte von Stein met in Weimar. It was the beginning of a deep friendship which lasted for twelve years. During this time she had a strong influence on Goethe's work and life. Goethe took into his house her eleven-year-old son Fritz (her darling), in May 1783, and took over the boy's education to her satisfaction.

This period of her life might have been the happiest since she was in the center of social life and attention and met many famous personalities, e.g., Friedrich Schiller, Karl Ludwig Knebel, and Johann Georg Zimmermann. She frequently corresponded with Schiller's wife Charlotte.

In the eyes of her contemporaries

Knebel has given an outstanding depiction of von Stein's nature:

Loneliness and death

In 1786 the deep friendship between Charlotte and Johann Wolfgang von Goethe ended with his sudden departure to Italy without even telling her he wanted to go. Not until after 1800 did their relationship begin to normalize and even then it never became as close as before.

After her husband had died in 1793 Charlotte retired from society and became more and more lonely.
In 1794 she wrote the drama Dido— a literary self-portrait that also depicted her disappointment about Goethe's behavior. It reflected the years from 1770 to 1790 and the situation in Weimar at that time. As depicted by Virgil, Dido (Queen of Carthage) was forsaken by her lover Aeneas who set off for Italy - an obvious parallel to von Stein herself and Goethe.

Charlotte von Stein died on 6 January 1827 at the age of 85.

Legacy

The German poet Peter Hacks presented his play "Gespräch im Hause Stein über den abwesenden Herrn von Goethe" (A Discussion in the Stein Home about the Absent Mr. Goethe) in 1974. This monodrama became a worldwide success and is seen as a subtle analysis of the fate of Charlotte von Stein.

References

External links
picture of the Stein family house in Weimar 
Full German Text of Charlotte von Stein's play Dido

1742 births
1827 deaths
German ladies-in-waiting
People from Eisenach
People from Saxe-Eisenach
German untitled nobility
Charlotte
Johann Wolfgang von Goethe
18th-century German people